David or Dave Mason may refer to:

Music
 David Mason (trumpeter) (1926–2011), British musician
 Dave Mason (born 1946), British musician, member of Traffic
 Dave Mason (Australian musician) (born c. 1954), Australian rock singer-songwriter, member of The Reels

Politics
 David H. Mason (1818–1873), American attorney and Republican politician
 Sir David Mason (businessman)  (1862–1940), Lord Provost of Glasgow 1926 to 1929
 David Marshall Mason (1865–1945), UK politician
 David M. Mason (born 1957), member of the Federal Election Commission

Sports
 Dave Mason (rugby league) (–1966), New Zealand rugby league footballer
 Dave Mason (footballer) (1913–1983), English association footballer
 Dave Mason (American football) (born 1949), American football player

Other
 David Mason (art dealer) (born 1939), London art dealer and Thalidomide parent activist
 David S. Mason (born 1947), professor of political science
 David A. Mason (born 1957), professor of cultural tourism and author of books about Korea
 David Mason (writer) (born 1954), American writer
 David Mason (murderer) (1956–1993), American serial killer
 David Mason (mason), American stone-wall mason
 David Mason, Australian adventurer; see

See also
David Masson (disambiguation)
Mason (surname)